This article is the discography of English/Australian instrumental rock group Sky.

Albums

Studio albums

Live albums

Compilation albums

Box sets

Singles

Videos

Video albums

References 

Discographies of British artists
Discographies of Australian artists
Rock music group discographies